The following is a list of unproduced Robert Zemeckis projects in roughly chronological order. During his long career, American film director Robert Zemeckis has worked on several projects which never progressed beyond the pre-production stage under his direction. Some of these projects fell in development hell, were officially canceled, were in development limbo or would see life under a different production team.

1980s

Cocoon 
Before the release of Romancing The Stone, Zemeckis was attached to direct Cocoon and Ron Howard replaced him.

Who Discovered Roger Rabbit

1990s

The Shadow

The Cobra Event 

On September 19, 1997, Zemeckis was slated to produce the film adaptation of Richard Preston's novel The Cobra Event for DreamWorks Pictures.

The Fermata adaptation

Star Wars: Episode I – The Phantom Menace 

In the 1990s, Zemeckis was one of three directors, including Ron Howard and Steven Spielberg, in talks with George Lucas to direct Star Wars: Episode I – The Phantom Menace, which Howard revealed on a 2015 Happy, Sad Confused episode that it was too daunting and Lucas ended up directing.

2000s

Gump & Co.

The Corrections

Borgia 
On November 2, 2005, Zemeckis had signed on to produce Neil Jordan's historical drama Borgia through ImageMovers, which eventually became a TV series on Showtime.

Measle and the Wrathmonk

Airman

Calling All Robots 
On March 26, 2008, Michael Dougherty was set to direct the animated sci-fi adventure film Calling All Robots with Zemeckis producing the film through ImageMovers Digital for Walt Disney Pictures.

Yellow Submarine remake

Stoneheart

The Nutcracker 
On November 26, 2009, Zemeckis had signed on to produce and direct the motion capture animated film adaptation of E.T.A. Hoffmann’s The Nutcracker through ImageMovers Digital for Walt Disney Pictures. On July 21, 2016, Universal Pictures revived the adaptation, which may or may not use motion capture, with Zemeckis only set to produce the film and Evan Spiliotopoulos was hired to write the script. There has been no information since.

2010s

Dark Life film

Timeless 
On September 29, 2010, Warner Bros announced that Zemeckis would produce Mike Thompson's time-travel script Timeless through ImageMovers.

The Wizard of Oz remake 
On November 16, 2010, Warner Bros announced that Zemeckis plans to remake The Wizard of Oz with the original script, but Zemeckis left the project.

How to Survive a Garden Gnome Attack 
On April 14, 2011, Zemeckis had signed on to produce and potentially direct the live-action/animated hybrid film adaptation of Chuck Sambuchino's book How to Survive a Garden Gnome Attack along with The Gotham Group and Sony Pictures Animation. In November that year, Chad Damiani and JP Lavin were hired to write the script.

Replay film 
On April 29, 2011, Zemeckis was set to direct the film adaptation of Replay after Ben Affleck left the project. On October 3, 2012, Greg Berlanti was set to direct the film adaptation.

Animated American 
On May 17, 2011, Zemeckis was slated to produce the live-action/animated hybrid film Animated American for Disney with Rob Edwards writing the script.

Major Matt Mason film

Fort: Prophet of the Unexplained

Demonologist film 
On February 22, 2012, Universal Pictures announced plans for a film adaptation of Andrew Pyper’s Demonologist, with Zemeckis producing the film through ImageMovers.

Taking Flight biopic 
On August 6, 2012, Zemeckis was set to direct the biographical crime drama Taking Flight about Colton Harris-Moore, for 20th Century Fox after David Gordon Green dropped out of the project. However, the film fell into development hell and its fate is unknown after Disney's acquisition of 21st Century Fox was completed.

The Magic Catalogue 
On October 8, 2012, Disney announced that Jason Fuchs will write Chris Appelhans’s original sci-fi adventure story The Magic Catalogue and Zemeckis set to produce the film with his ImageMovers production team.

Rose 
On August 5, 2013, Zemeckis was set to produce Nathaniel Halpern's script Rose through ImageMovers for Focus Features.

The Execution of Noa P. Singleton 
On August 21, 2013, Zemeckis was set to produce the film adaptation of Elizabeth L. Silver’s novel The Execution of Noa P. Singleton through ImageMovers.

Choas Walking film

Billy Ray TV series 
On September 24, 2013, it was reported that Zemeckis was set executive produce Clifton Campbell's television series Billy Ray and direct the pilot episode for Fox.

The Miraculous Journey of Edward Tulane film

The Gafin Academy 
On June 8, 2016, Zemeckis was set to co-produce the film The Gafin Academy with Voltage Films, John & Drew Dowdle set to direct, and Aaron Rapke and Stewart Kaye adapting Danny King’s novel School for Scumbags.

Untitled Genghis Khan tomb hunting film 
On August 15, 2017, Zemeckis was set to produce an untitled Genghis Khan tomb hunting film for Universal Pictures, with Evan Spiliotopoulos writing the script and Dwayne Johnson set to produce and potentially star.

Live-action “The Jetsons” TV series

Steel Soldiers 
On February 6, 2018, Zemeckis was set to produce the sci-fi action film Steel Soldiers with Ken Kaufman writing the script.

The King 
On August 29, 2018, Zemeckis was set to direct The King about Kamehameha I, with Randall Wallace writing the script and Dwayne Johnson set to star at Warner Bros. and New Line Cinema.

The Cove TV series 
On September 10, 2018, it was reported that Zemeckis would executive produce Chad Fiveash and James Stoteraux's television series The Cove for The CW.

Offers

Superman reboot
On November 1, 2010, Zemeckis was offered to direct a Superman reboot, but passed on it which led to Man of Steel.

The Flash 
On May 16, 2017, Zemeckis was offered to direct The Flash.

Be More Chill film adaptation 
On October 20, 2018, it was reported that Zemeckis would've produced the film adaptation of Joe Iconis' musical adaptation of the novel Be More Chill through ImageMovers, but Shawn Levy and Greg Berlanti acquired the project.

References 

Zemeckis, Robert